Sebastian Bonecki (born 13 February 1995 in Legnica) is a Polish professional footballer who plays as a midfielder for Zagłębie Sosnowiec.

Career

Club
He made his debut for Zagłębie in a 1–0 defeat to Cracovia Kraków on 23 August 2013.

In 2018, he signed for Odra Opole.

References

External links 
 
 

Polish footballers
Zagłębie Lubin players
Chrobry Głogów players
Odra Opole players
Bruk-Bet Termalica Nieciecza players
Zagłębie Sosnowiec players
Ekstraklasa players
I liga players
III liga players
Living people
1995 births
People from Legnica
Sportspeople from Lower Silesian Voivodeship
Association football midfielders
Poland youth international footballers